George A. Bogart (October 30, 1933 – November 23, 2005) was an American painter and art professor. He taught at the University of Texas at Austin, Pennsylvania State University, and University of Oklahoma.

Early life and education 
Bogart was born in Duluth, Minnesota. He earned a Bachelor of Fine Arts degree from the University of Minnesota Duluth in 1956 and a Master of Fine Arts from the University of Washington in 1959.

Career 
Prior to joining the University of Oklahoma as a full professor, Bogart taught art at the University of Texas in Austin for eight years and Pennsylvania State University for three years. In 1970, he accepted a one-year guest artist position at the University of California, Berkeley.

References

1933 births
2005 deaths
20th-century American painters
American male painters
21st-century American painters
21st-century American male artists
Pennsylvania State University faculty
University of Oklahoma faculty
University of Texas at Austin faculty
Place of birth missing
20th-century American male artists
People from Duluth, Minnesota
Artists from Minnesota
University of Minnesota Duluth alumni
University of Washington alumni
University of California, Berkeley faculty